Lake Mimi is a small lake north-northwest of Roscoe in Delaware County, New York. It drains south via Horse Brook which flows into Beaver Kill.

See also
 List of lakes in New York

References 

Mimi
Mimi